The House of Nassau is a diversified aristocratic dynasty in Germania. It is named after the lordship associated with Nassau Castle, located in present-day Nassau, Rhineland-Palatinate, Germany. The lords of Nassau were originally titled "Count of Nassau", then elevated to the princely class as "Princely Counts". Early on they divided into two main branches:  the elder (Walramian) branch, that gave rise to the German king Adolf, and the younger (Ottonian) branch, that gave rise to the Princes of Orange and the monarchs of the Netherlands.
 
At the end of the Holy Roman Empire and the Napoleonic Wars, the Walramian branch had inherited or acquired all the Nassau ancestral lands and proclaimed themselves, with the permission of the Congress of Vienna, the "Dukes of Nassau", forming the independent state of Nassau with its capital at Wiesbaden; this territory today mainly lies in the German Federal State of Hesse, and partially in the neighbouring State of Rhineland-Palatinate. The Duchy was annexed in 1866 after the Austrian-Prussian War as an ally of Austria by Prussia. It was subsequently incorporated into the newly created Prussian Province of Hesse-Nassau.

Today, the term Nassau is used in Germany as a name for a geographical, historical and cultural region, but no longer has any political meaning. All Dutch and Luxembourgish monarchs since 1815 have been senior members of the House of Nassau. However, in 1890 in the Netherlands and in 1912 in Luxembourg, the male lines of heirs to the two thrones became extinct, so that since then, they have descended in the female line from the House of Nassau.

According to German tradition, the family name is passed on only in the male line of succession. The House would therefore, from this German perspective, have been extinct since 1985. However, both Dutch and Luxembourgish monarchial traditions, constitutional rules and legislation in that matter differ from the German tradition, and thus neither country considers the House extinct. The Grand Duke of Luxembourg uses "Duke of Nassau" as his secondary title and a title of pretense to the dignity of Chief of the House of Nassau (being the most senior member of the eldest branch of the House), but not to lay any territorial claims to the former Duchy of Nassau which is now part of the Federal Republic of Germany.

Origins 
The area that came to be the county of Nassau was part of the Duchy of Franconia.  When Franconia fragmented in the early 13th century with the fall of the Hohenstaufen, Nassau emerged as an independent state as part of the Holy Roman Empire.

Count Dudo-Henry of Laurenburg (ca. 1060 – ca. 1123) is considered the founder of the House of Nassau. Dudo was a son of Rupert (German: Ruprecht), the Archbishop of Mainz's Vogt in Siegerland.  Dudo was himself lord or Vogt of Lipporn and Miehlen and owned large parts of the lands of Lipporn/Laurenburg. There are more persons known who, as owners of the lands of Lipporn/Laurenburg (and thus the predecessors of Dudo), probably also were his ancestors. The first is a certain Drutwin mentioned in 881 as a landowner in Prüm, and who is the oldest known possible ancestor of the House of Nassau.

Dudo is mentioned as Tuto de Lurinburg between 1093 and 1117.  Dudo built the castle of Laurenburg on the Lahn a few kilometers upriver from Nassau around 1090 as the seat of his lordship. He is first mentioned in a document in the purported founding-charter of Maria Laach Abbey in 1093 (although many historians consider the document to be fabricated). In 1159, Nassau Castle became the ruling seat, and the house is now named after this castle.  In a charter dated 1134 (after his death) he is mentioned as Count of Laurenburg.

In 1117, Dudo donated land to Schaffhausen Abbey for construction of a monastery in Lipporn. Around 1117, Dudo, Count of Laurenburg founded at Lipporn a Benedictine priory dedicated and named for Saint Florin of Koblenz, and dependent on the Benedictine All Saints Abbey in Schaffhausen. About 1126, his son, Rupert I, Count of Laurenburg, the Vogt of Lipporn, established it as a separate and independent abbey. The Romanesque buildings were constructed between 1126 and 1145, presumably with a three-nave basilica. The Abbey included both a monastery for monks and a small, separate one for nuns.

In 1122, Dudo received the castle of Idstein in the Taunus as a fief under the Archbishopric of Mainz. This was part of the inheritance of Count Udalrich of Idstein-Eppstein. He also received the Vogtship of the richly endowed Benedictine Bleidenstadt Abbey (in present-day Taunusstein).

The Counts of Laurenburg and Nassau expanded their authority under the brothers Robert (Ruprecht) I (1123–1154) and Arnold I of Laurenburg (1123–1148). Robert was the first person to call himself Count of Nassau, but the title was not confirmed until 1159, five years after Robert's death. Robert's son Walram I (1154–1198) was the first person to be legally titled Count of Nassau.

The chronology of the Counts of Laurenburg is not certain and the link between Robert I and Walram I is especially controversial. Also, some sources consider Gerhard, listed as co-Count of Laurenburg in 1148, to be the son of Robert I's brother, Arnold I. However, Erich Brandenburg in his Die Nachkommen Karls des Großen states that it is most likely that Gerhard was Robert I's son, because Gerard was the name of Beatrix of Limburg's maternal grandfather.

Geography

List of Rulers

Counts of Laurenburg (ca. 1093–1159) and Nassau (1159-1255)
In 1255, Henry II's sons, Walram II and Otto I, split the Nassau possessions. The descendants of Walram became known as the Walram Line, which became important in the Countship of Nassau and Luxembourg. The descendants of Otto became known as the Ottonian Line, which would inherit parts of Nassau, France and the Netherlands. Both lines would often themselves be divided over the next few centuries. In 1783, the heads of various branches of the House of Nassau sealed the Nassau Family Pact (Erbverein) to regulate future succession in their states, and to establish a dynastic hierarchy whereby the Prince of Orange-Nassau-Dietz was recognised as President of the House of Nassau.

The Walramian Line (1255–1985)

The Walramian Line concentrated their efforts primarily on their German lands.  The exception was Adolf, King of the Romans (c. 1255 –  2 July 1298) who was the count of Nassau from about 1276 and the elected king of Germany from 1292 until his deposition by the prince-electors in 1298. He was never crowned by the pope, which would have secured him the imperial title. He was the first physically and mentally healthy ruler of the Holy Roman Empire ever to be deposed without a papal excommunication. Adolf died shortly afterwards in the Battle of Göllheim fighting against his successor Albert of Habsburg.  He was the second in the succession of so-called count-kings of several rivalling comital houses striving after the Roman-German royal dignity after the expiration the Hohenstaufen. The Nassaus, however, were not on the imperial throne long enough to establish themselves in larger landholdings to increase their hereditary power such as the Luxemburgers did in Bohemia or the Habsburgs did in Austria.

After Gerlach's death, the possessions of the Walram line were divided into Nassau-Weilburg and Nassau-Wiesbaden-Idstein.

Nassau-Weilburg (1344–1816)

Count Walram II began the Countship of Nassau in Weilburg (Nassau-Weilburg), which existed to 1816. The Walram line also received the lordship of Merenberg in 1328 and Saarbrücken (by marriage) in 1353. The sovereigns of this house afterwards ruled the Duchy of Nassau from its establishment in 1806 as part of the Confederation of the Rhine (jointly with Nassau-Usingen until 1816).  The last reigning Duke, Adolph, became Duke of Nassau in August 1839, following the death of his father William. The Duchy was annexed to Prussia in 1866 after Austria's defeat in the Austro-Prussian War.

From 1815 to 1839, Grand Duchy of Luxembourg was ruled by the kings of the Netherlands as a province of the Netherlands. Following the Treaty of London (1839), the Grand Duchy of Luxembourg became independent but remained in personal union with the Netherlands. Following the death of his sons, the Dutch king William III had no male heirs to succeed him. In the Netherlands, females were allowed to succeed to the throne. Luxembourg, however, followed Salic law which barred females from succession. Thus, upon King William III's death, the crown of the Netherlands passed to his only daughter, Wilhelmina, while that of Luxembourg passed to Adolph in accordance with the Nassau Family Pact. Adolph died in 1905 and was succeeded by his son, William IV.

and from 1890 the Grand Duchy of Luxembourg. The branch of Nassau-Weilburg ultimately became rulers of Luxembourg.

Counts of Nassau-Weilburg (1344–1688), Princely counts of Nassau-Weilburg (1688–1816) and Dukes of Nassau (1816–1866)

Grand Dukes of Luxembourg (from the House of Nassau-Weilburg) - 1890–1912 and succession through a female onwards

1890–1905: Adolphe
1905–1912: William IV
1912–1919: Marie-Adélaïde
1919–1964: Charlotte
1964–2000: Jean
2000–present: Henri

Counts of Merenberg 

Count of Merenberg (German: Graf von Merenberg) is a hereditary title of nobility that was bestowed in 1868 by the reigning Prince of Waldeck and Pyrmont, George Victor, upon the morganatic wife and male-line descendants of Prince Nikolaus Wilhelm of Nassau (1832–1905), younger brother of Adolf, last Duke of Nassau/Grand Duke of Luxembourg.  Nicholas married Natalia Alexandrovna Pushkina (1836–1913), former wife of Russian general Mikhail Leontievich von Dubelt.

In 1907 Grand Duke Adolph declared the family non-dynastic/morganatic. Had they not been excluded from the succession, they would have inherited the headship of the house in 1912. Georg Nickolaus would have thus become the reigning Grand Duke of Luxembourg.

In 1907, William IV, obtained passage of a law in Luxembourg confirming the exclusion of the Merenbergs from succession to the grand ducal throne. Georg Nikolaus's protests against the Luxembourg Diet's confirmation of the succession rights of William IV's daughter, Princess Marie-Adélaïde, were expected to be taken up by the Netherlands and by the Great Powers which had guaranteed Luxembourg's neutrality in 1867. Nonetheless, Marie-Adélaïde did succeed her father, to become Luxembourg's first female monarch, in 1912.  She, in turn, abdicated in favour of her sister Charlotte, whose descendants have reigned over Luxembourg since then. Georg Nikolaus died in 1948.  His son Georg Michael Alexander was the last legitimate descendant of the House of Nassau.  He died in 1965

Counts of Nassau-Wiesbaden-Idstein (1344–1728)

From the documentary mention in 1102 until 1721, Idstein was, with interruptions, residence of the Counts of Nassau-Idstein and other Nassau lines. One of the Counts was, as said above, Adolf of Germany, the Holy Roman Emperor from 1292 to 1298.

The Nassau Counts' holdings were subdivided many times among heirs, with the parts being brought together again whenever a line died out. This yielded an older Nassau-Idstein line from 1480 to 1509, later merging once again with Nassau-Wiesbaden and Nassau-Weilburg and, from 1629 to 1721, a newer Nassau-Idstein line.

In 1721, Idstein passed to Nassau-Ottweiler, and in 1728 to Nassau-Usingen, thereby losing its status as a residence town, although it became the seat of the Nassau Archives and of an Oberamt.

In the 1170s, the Count of Nassau, Walram I, received the area around Wiesbaden as a fiefdom.  In 1232 Wiesbaden became a Reichsstadt, an imperial city, of the Holy Roman Empire. Wiesbaden returned to the control of the House of Nassau in 1270 under Count Walram II, Count of Nassau. However, Wiesbaden and the castle at Sonnenberg were again destroyed in 1283 in conflict with Eppstein.

Walram's son and successor Adolf was, as said above, king of Germany from 1292 until 1298. In 1329, under Adolf's son Gerlach I of Nassau-Weilburg the House of Nassau and thereby, Wiesbaden, received the right of coinage from Holy Roman Emperor Louis the Bavarian.

In 1355, the County of Nassau-Weilburg was divided among the sons of Gerlach. The County of Nassau's holdings would be subdivided many times among heirs, with the parts being brought together again whenever a line died out. Wiesbaden became the seat of the County of Nassau-Wiesbaden under Count Adolf I (1307–1370), eldest son of Gerlach. It eventually fell back to Nassau-Weilburg in 1605.

Counts of Nassau-Saarbrücken (1429–1797) 

Philipp I ruled both Nassau-Saarbrücken and Nassau-Weilburg and in 1393 inherited through his wife Johanna of Hohenlohe the lordships Kirchheimbolanden and Stauf.  He also received half of Nassau-Ottweiler in 1393 and other territories later during his reign. After his death in 1429 the territories around Saarbrücken and along the Lahn were kept united until 1442, when they were again divided among his sons into the lines Nassau-Saarbrücken (west of the Rhine) and Nassau-Weilburg (east of the Rhine), the so-called Younger line of Nassau-Weilburg.

In 1507 Count John Ludwig I significantly enlarged his territory.  After his death in 1544 the county was split into three parts, the three lines (Ottweiler, Saarbrücken proper and Kirchheim) were all extinct in 1574 and all of Nassau-Saarbrücken was united with Nassau-Weilburg until 1629. This new division however was not executed until the Thirty Years' War was over and in 1651 three counties were established: Nassau-Idstein, Nassau-Weilburg and Nassau-Saarbrücken.

Only eight years later, Nassau-Saarbrücken was again divided into:
Nassau-Saarbrücken proper, fell to Nassau-Ottweiler in 1723
Nassau-Ottweiler, fell to Nassau-Usingen in 1728
Nassau-Usingen

In 1735 Nassau-Usingen was divided again into Nassau-Usingen and Nassau-Saarbrücken. In 1797 Nassau-Usingen finally inherited Nassau-Saarbrücken, it was (re-)unified with Nassau-Weilburg and raised to the Duchy of Nassau in 1806. The first Duke of Nassau was Frederick August of Nassau-Usingen who died in 1816. Wilhelm, Prince of Nassau-Weilburg inherits the Duchy of Nassau. But, territories of Nassau Saarbrücken was occupied by France in 1793 and was annexed as Sarre department in 1797. Finally County of Nassau-Saarbrücken was part of Prussia in 1814.

After Henry Louis's death, Nassau-Saarbrücken fell to Charles William, Prince of Nassau-Usingen until Adolph came of age in 1805.

Princes of Nassau-Usingen (1659–1816)

The origin of the county lies in the medieval county of Weilnau that was acquired by the counts of Nassau-Weilburg in 1602.  That county was divided in 1629 into the lines of Nassau-Weilburg, Nassau-Idstein and Nassau-Saarbrücken that was divided only 30 years later in 1659.  The emerging counties were Nassau-Saarbrücken, Nassau-Ottweiler and Nassau-Usingen. At the beginning of the 18th century, three of the Nassau lines died out and Nassau-Usingen became their successor (1721 Nassau-Idstein, 1723 Nassau-Ottweiler und 1728 Nassau-Saarbrücken).
In 1735 Nassau-Usingen was divided again into Nassau-Usingen and Nassau-Saarbrücken. In 1797 Nassau-Usingen inherited Nassau-Saarbrücken. In 1816, Nassau-Usingen merged with Nassau-Weilburg to form the Duchy of Nassau.  See "Dukes of Nassau" above.

Following Frederick Augustus' death, the princely title was adopted (in pretense) by his half brother through an unequal marriage, Karl Philip. As head of the House in 1907, Wilhelm IV declared the Count of Merenberg non-dynastic; by extension, this would indicate that (according to Luxembourgish laws regarding the House of Nassau) this branch would assume the Salic headship of the house in 1965, following the death of the last male Count of Merenberg.

The Ottonian Line

The partition of the county of Nassau between Otto, and his older brother Walram (above), resulted in a permanent division between the 2 branches of the family.  The Walramian branch tended to concentrate on their German lands, while the Ottonians, as we will see below, established themselves in the Netherlands and became great magnates, leaders of the Dutch Revolt, the stadtholders of the Dutch Republican government, and eventual kings of the Netherlands.  This, however, was not before many divisions and reunitings.  The first was between sons of Otto, with the main power base being centered around the caste of Dillenburg:

1255–1290: Otto I, Count of Nassau in Siegen, Dillenburg, Beilstein, and Ginsberg
1290–1303: Joint rule by Henry, John and Emicho I, sons of Otto I

In 1303, Otto's sons divided the possessions of the Ottonian line. Henry received Nassau-Siegen, John received Nassau-Dillenburg and Emicho I received Nassau-Hadamar.  After John's death. Nassau-Dillenburg fell to Henry.

Counts of Nassau-Dillenburg 

The Ottonian portion of the county of Nassau was divided and sub-divided, as shown in the genealogical charts below, several times, so that each son of the previous count would have a portion.  Eventually, these lines would all die out in favor of the main branch of the family, which had established themselves in The Netherlands.

Counts of Nassau-Beilstein 

The counts of Nassau in Beilstein were involved mostly in local/regional German affairs in their area of the Rhine.

In 1343, Nassau-Beilstein was split off from Nassau-Dillenburg. After John III's death, Nassau-Beilstein fell back to Nassau-Dillenburg.  It was split off again in 1607 (see below) for George, who inherited the rest of Nassau-Dillenburg in 1620.

First Counts and Princes of Nassau-Hadamar

First House of Nassau-Siegen

The branch of Nassau-Siegen was a collateral line of the House of Nassau, and ruled in Siegen. The first Count of Nassau-Siegen was Henry I, Count of Nassau-Siegen (d. 1343), the elder son of Otto I, Count of Nassau. His son Otto II, Count of Nassau-Siegen ruled also in Dillenburg. In 1328, John, Count of Nassau-Dillenburg died unmarried and childless, and Dillenburg fell to Henry I of Nassau-Siegen.  For counts of Nassau-Siegen in between 1343 and 1606, see "Counts of Nassau-Dillenburg" above.

Netherland Nassaus/Orange-Nassau

The House of Orange-Nassau stems from the elder branch of the Ottonian Line. The connection was via Engelbert I, who offered his services to the Duke of Burgundy, married in 1403 Johanna van Polanen, the heiress of the barony of Breda, the lordship of den Lek and other lands in the duchy of Brabant at the mouth of the Rhine delta and the Scheldt river.  As the Scheldt was the main trade artery in the Burgundian/Habsburg Netherlands during the time, the Netherand Nassaus benefitted from the commerce.  These lands formed the core of the Nassau's Dutch possessions.

The importance of the Nassaus grew throughout the 15th and 16th century. Henry III of Nassau-Breda was appointed stadtholder of Holland, Zeeland and Utrecht by Emperor Charles V in the beginning of the 16th century. Henry married Claudia of Châlon-Orange from French Burgundy in 1515. Their son René of Chalon inherited in 1530 the independent and sovereign Principality of Orange from his mother's brother, Philibert of Châlon. As the first Nassau to be the Prince of Orange, René could have used "Orange-Nassau" as his new family name. However, his uncle, in his will, had stipulated that René should continue the use of the name Châlon-Orange. At René's death in 1544, he left all his lands to his cousin William of Nassau-Dillenburg, including the sovereign principality of Orange. This "William I of Orange", in English better known as William the Silent, became the founder of the House of Orange-Nassau and the leader of the Dutch Revolt that lead to the formation of the Dutch Republic as a separate sovereign nation.

Within the government of the Dutch Republic, The Prince of Orange was also not just another noble among equals in the Netherlands.  First, he was the traditional leader of the nation in war and in rebellion against Spain.  He was uniquely able to transcend the local issues of the cities, towns and provinces.  He was also a sovereign ruler in his own right (see Prince of Orange article).  This gave him a great deal of prestige, even in a republic.  He was the center of a real court like the Stuarts and Bourbons, French speaking, and extravagant to a scale.  It was natural for foreign ambassadors and dignitaries to present themselves to him and consult with him as well as to the States General to which they were officially credited.  The marriage policy of the princes, allying themselves twice with the Royal Stuarts, also gave them acceptance into the royal caste of rulers.

The house of Orange-Nassau was relatively unlucky in establishing a hereditary dynasty in an age that favoured hereditary rule. The Stuarts and the Bourbons came to power at the same time as the Oranges, the Vasas and Oldenburgs were able to establish a hereditary kingship in Sweden and Denmark, and the Hohenzollerns were able to set themselves on a course to the rule of Germany.  The House of Orange was no less gifted than those houses, in fact, some might argue more so, as their ranks included some the foremost statesmen and captains of the time.  Although the institutions of the United Provinces became more republican and entrenched as time went on, William the Silent had been offered the countship of Holland and Zealand, and only his assassination prevented his accession to those offices.  This fact did not go unforgotten by his successors.

Besides showing the relationships among the family, the tree above then also points out an extraordinary run of bad luck.  In the 211 years from the death of William the Silent to the conquest by France, there was only one time that a son directly succeeded his father as Prince of Orange, Stadholder and Captain-General without a minority (William II).  When the Oranges were in power, they also tended to settle for the actualities of power, rather than the appearances, which increasingly tended to upset the ruling regents of the towns and cities.  On being offered the dukedom of Gelderland by the States of that province, William III let the offer lapse as liable to raise too much opposition in the other provinces.

The main house of Orange-Nassau also spawned several illegitimate branches.  These branches contributed to the political and economic history of England and the Netherlands. Justinus van Nassau was the only extramarital child of William of Orange. He was a Dutch army commander known for unsuccessfully defending Breda against the Spanish, and the depiction of his surrender on the famous picture by Diego Velázquez, The Surrender of Breda. Louis of Nassau, Lord of De Lek and Beverweerd was a younger illegitimate son of Prince Maurice and Margaretha van Mechelen. His descendants were later created Counts of Nassau-LaLecq. One of his sons was the famous general Henry de Nassau, Lord of Overkirk, King William III's Master of the Horse, and one of the most trusted generals of John Churchill, 1st Duke of Marlborough.  His descendants became the Earls of Grantham in England. Frederick van Nassau, Lord of Zuylestein, an illegitimate son of Frederick Henry, Prince of Orange, gave rise to the Earls of Rochford in England. The 4th earl of Rochford was a famous English diplomat and a statesman.

With the death of William III, the legitimate direct male line of William the Silent became extinct and thereby the first House of Orange-Nassau. John William Friso, the senior agnatic descendant of William the Silent's brother and a cognatic descendant of Frederick Henry, grandfather of William III, inherited the princely title and all the possessions in the low countries and Germany, but not the Principality of Orange itself. Orange had been invaded and captured by King Louis XIV in 1672 during the Franco-Dutch War, and again in August 1682, but William did not concede his claim to rule, and recovered the principality via the peace treaties.  Louis again invaded and captured the principality in 1702.  He enfeoffed François Louis, Prince of Conti, a Bourbon relative of the Châlon dynasty, with the Principality of Orange, so that there were three claimants to the title. The Principality was finally ceded to France under the Treaty of Utrecht that ended the wars with King Louis XIV. Frederick I of Prussia ceded the Principality to France (without surrendering the princely title), though John William Friso of Nassau-Dietz, the other claimant to the principality, did not concur. Only with the treaty of partition in 1732 did John William Friso's successor William IV, Prince of Orange, renounce all his claims to the territory, but again (like Frederick I) he did not renounce his claim to the title. In the same treaty an agreement was made between both claimants, stipulating that both houses be allowed to use the title.  John William Friso, who also was the Prince of Nassau-Dietz, founded thereby the second House of Orange-Nassau (the suffix name "Dietz" was dropped of the combined name Orange-Nassau-Dietz).

The Revolutionary and Napoleonic era was a tumultuous episode of the history of both the Ottonian and Walramian branches of the House of Nassau. France's dominance of the international order severely strained the House of Nassau's traditional strategy of international conflict resolution, which was to maintain links with all serious power-brokers through a dynastic network in the hope of playing one off against the other. Despite that both branches of the House of Nassau reinvigorated the dynastic network in the years of liberation, 1812–1814, the post-Napoleonic European order saw both branches set on different historical paths.

After the post-Napoleonic reorganization of Europe, the head of House of Orange-Nassau became "King/Queen of the Netherlands".

Princes of Orange

House of Orange-Nassau
1544–1584: William I, also Count of Katzenelnbogen, Vianden, Dietz, Buren and Leerdam and Lord of IJsselstein, Baron of Breda, etc. Stadholder of Holland, Zealand and Utrect, etc.
1584–1618: Philip William, also Count of Nassau-Dillenburg, Count of Vianden, Buren and Leerdam and Lord of IJsselstein, Baron of Breda, etc.
1618–1625: Maurice, also Count of Nassau-Dillenburg, Count of Vianden, Buren and Leerdam and Lord of IJsselstein, Baron of Breda, etc. Stadholder of Holland, Zealand and Utrect, etc., Captain-General of the Armies of the Dutch Republic.
1625–1647: Frederick Henry, also Count of Nassau-Dillenburg, Count of Vianden, Buren and Leerdam and Lord of IJsselstein, Baron of Breda, etc. Stadholder of Holland, Zealand and Utrect, etc., Captain-General of the Armies of the Dutch Republic.
1647–1650: William II, also Count of Nassau-Dillenburg, Count of Vianden, Buren and Leerdam and Lord of IJsselstein, Baron of Breda, etc., Stadholder of Holland, Zealand and Utrect, etc., Captain-General of the Armies of the Dutch Republic.
1650–1702: William III, also Count of Nassau-Dillenburg, Count of Vianden, Buren and Leerdam, Lord of IJsselstein, Baron of Breda, etc.,  Stadholder of Holland, Zealand and Utrect, etc., Captain-General of the Armies of the Dutch Republic, and (from 1689) King of England, Scotland, and Ireland

In 1702, the Orange-Nassau line ended with King William III. He named his cousin John William Friso of Nassau-Dietz as his heir in The Netherlands and the principality of Orange, passing over the claims of the Hohenzollerns of Brandenburg/Prussia.

Second House of Orange-Nassau(-Dietz)

1702–1711: John William Friso, also Prince of Nassau-Dietz, Count of Vianden, Buren and Leerdam and Lord of IJsselstein, Baron of Breda, etc. Stadholder of Holland, Zealand and Utrect, etc., Captain-General of the Armies of the Dutch Republic.
1711–1751: William IV, also Prince of Nassau-Dietz, Count of Vianden, Buren and Leerdam and Lord of IJsselstein, Baron of Breda, etc. Stadholder of Holland, Zealand and Utrect, etc., Captain-General of the Armies of the Dutch Republic.
1751–1806: William V, also Prince of Nassau-Dietz, Count of Vianden, Buren and Leerdam and Lord of IJsselstein, Baron of Breda, etc. Stadholder of Holland, Zealand and Utrect, etc., Captain-General of the Armies of the Dutch Republic.
1806–1815: William VI, also Prince of Fulda and Count of Corvey, Weingarten and Dortmund; in 1815 became King William I of the Netherlands

Kings and Queens of the Netherlands (from the House of Orange-Nassau-Dietz)
1815–1840: William I, also Duke and Grand Duke of Luxemburg and Duke of Limburg
1840–1849: William II, also Grand Duke of Luxemburg and Duke of Limburg
1849–1890: William III, also Grand Duke of Luxemburg and Duke of Limburg
1890–1948: Wilhelmina
Following defunct German laws that no longer have relevance due to the end of German nobility, the House of Orange-Nassau(-Dietz) has been extinct since the death of Wilhelmina (1962). Dutch laws and the Dutch nation do not consider it extinct.
1948–1980: Juliana
1980–2013: Beatrix
2013-present: Willem-Alexander

Younger Lines of the Ottonian House of Nassau, 16th, 17th, and 18th Centuries

When William the Silent inherited the lands of the Netherland Nassaus and the Principality of Orange, the German lands in the county of Nassau went to his younger brother, Jan VI, as shown below, and were subdivided amongst his surviving sons in 1606.  A good many of these maintained ties with the Dutch Republic and served as stadholders and officers in the Dutch States Army.

Counts of Nassau-Dillenburg, continuation

The counts of Nassau in Dillenburg were the continuation of the main line of the Ottonian counts of Nassau, although only the 2nd oldest after The Netherlands Nassaus/house of Orange-Nassau.  John VI is called the "elder", but this is not in relation to his older brother William the Silent, but in relation to his son, John VII "the Middle" and his grandson, John VIII "the younger".  In the male line, the kings of The Netherlands spring from John VI until Queen Wilhelmina abdicated in 1948.  John VI played a leading role during the Dutch Revolt:  he was the principle author of the Union of Utrecht, which was the constitution of the Dutch Republic.  He also served as stadholder of Utrect and Gelderland when they were reconquered from the Spanish.  His eldest son, William Louis "Us Heit" (West Frisian for "our father") was Stadholder of Friesland, Groningen, and Drenthe, a General in the Dutch States Army and the chief lieutenant of his cousin Prince Maurice of Nassau, in their innovations in military strategy and organization, victories in the field, and governing of the Dutch Republic.

Second House of Nassau-Dietz 

The counts (later princes in 1650) of Nassau-Dietz continued their service to the Dutch Republic.  After the death of William Louis (see Second House of Nassau-Dillenburg) they were usually elected Stadholder of Friesland, Groningen, and Drenthe.  They also served as senior Generals in the Dutch States Army.

In his will, William III appointed John William Friso as his heir in The Netherlands (his lordships being his property to dispose of by law) as well as his heir to the principality of Orange, the principality being a sovereign state, and so his right to appoint his successor.  This was contested by the House of Hohenzollern, Kings of Prussia, and not finally settled until the mid 18th century.  In any case, the succession was in the title only, as Louis XIV of France had conquered the actual territory.

Second House of Nassau-Hadamar

In 1620, the younger line of Nassau-Hadamar was split off from Nassau-Dillenburg, as shown below.  John Louis, the first count, was a diplomat, who tried to protect his county from the ravages of the Thirty Years War.  In 1647, for his efforts in bringing about peace between Spain and the Netherlands, King Philip IV of Spain appointed him a knight in the Order of the Golden Fleece. In addition, as a special thanks for his role in establishing the Peace of Westphalia, he was elevated to the rank of prince in 1650 by Emperor Ferdinand III.  He did convert to Catholicism, so that Hadamar was Catholic after that.

Second House of Nassau-Siegen

In 1606 the younger line of Nassau-Siegen was split off from the House of Nassau-Dillenburg for John VII "the Middle".  As Dillenburg eventually was inherited by a younger son of John VI (see below), the line of Nassau-Siegen became the elder line of the Ottonian House of Nassau.  After John VII of Nassau-Siegen died in 1628, the land was divided:
 His eldest son, John VIII "the Younger", had converted to Catholicism and joined the Spanish Army. This caused a rivalry between him and his brother John Maurice below.  The result was that Siegen was split.  John VIII received the part of the county south of the river Sieg and the original castle in Siegen (which after 1695 was called the "Upper Castle").  John VIII was the founder of the Catholic line of Nassau-Siegen.

 John Maurice, who remained Protestant, was a soldier.  He received the part of the county north of the Sieg.  He was the founder of the Protestant line of Nassau-Siegen and he converted the former Franciscan monastery into a new residence, called the "Lower Castle", which was reconstructed after having burnt down at large parts in 1695. John Maurice spent most of his time away from Siegen, since he was governor of Dutch Brazil and later of the Prussian province of Cleves, Mark, and Ravensberg. In 1668, he was appointed first field-marshal of the Dutch States Army, and in 1673, he was charged by the Stadtholder William III to command the forces in Friesland and Groningen, and to defend the eastern frontier of the provinces, again against Van Galen. In 1675, his health compelled him to give up active military service, and he spent his last years in his beloved Cleves, where he died in December 1679. Between 1638 and 1674, his brother George Frederick ruled the Protestant part of the country.

In 1652, John Francis Desideratus of the Catholic line was elevated to Imperial Prince.  Count Henry of the Protestant line married Mary Magdalene of Limburg-Stirum, who brought the Lordship of Wisch in the County of Zutphen into the marriage.  In 1652, John Maurice of the Protestant line was also elevated to Imperial Prince.

In 1734, the Protestant line died out with the death of Frederick William II. Protestant Nassau-Siegen was annexed by Christian of Nassau-Dillenburg and William IV of Nassau-Diez.  When William Hyacinth, the last ruler of the Catholic line, died in 1743, Nassau-Siegen had died out in the male line, and the territory fell to Prince William IV of the Orange-Nassau-Dietz line, who thereby reunited all the lands of the Ottonian line of the House of Nassau.

Overview of Nassau coats of arms

Background and Origins

The ancestral coat of arms of the Ottonian line of the house of Nassau is shown below.  Their distant cousins of the Walramian line added a red coronet to distinguish them.   There is no documentation on how and why these arms came to be.  As a symbol of nobility, the lion was always a popular in western culture going all the way back to Hercules.  Using the heraldic insignia of a dominant power was a way, and still is a way, to show loyalty to that power.  Not using that insignia is a way to show independence.  The Netherlands, as territories bordering on the Holy Roman Empire with its Roman eagle  and France with its Fleur-de-lis, had many examples of this. The lion was so heavily used in the Netherlands for various provinces and families (see Leo Belgicus) that it became the national arms of the Dutch Republic, its successor states the Netherlands, Belgium, and Luxembourg.  Blue, because of its nearness to purple, which in the northern climes tended to fade (red was the other choice), was also a popular color for those with royal aspirations. The billets could have been anything from blocks of wood to abstractions of the reinforcements holding the shield together.  The fact that these were arms were very similar to those of the counts of Burgundy (Franche-Comté) did not seem to cause too much confusion.  It also held with one of the basic tenants of heraldry, that arms could not be repeated within a kingdom, but Nassau was considered to be in the Kingdom of Germany, while Franche-Comté was in the kingdom of Burgundy (see also Scrope v Grosvenor).

Coats of arms of sovereignty also show the territories that the dynasty claims to rule over.  The principle ones are depicted below, i.e.

The Principality of Orange, which gave them their major title and claim to equal status with all the other sovereign rulers of the world, Prince of Orange.

Then, 
The Lordship of Chalons and Arlay, a large set of lands in the Franche-Comté
The County of Geneva

And in Germany,
County of Katzenelnbogen a large set of lands near the County of Nassau
The County of Dietz, also near the County of Nassau
County of Meurs, bordering on the northeastern Netherlands

Finally, in the Netherlands, the real base of their wealth and power:
County of Vianden, in the southern Netherlands along the river Meuse.
Marquisate of Vlissingen (Flushing) and KampenVeere, which sat along the mouth of the Rhine and the trade routes across the North Sea and the world beyond.
County of Buren, also long the delta of the Rhine, but further inland.

In most of the estates in the more populous provinces of Holland and Zealand, the land itself was secondary to the profit on the commerce that flowed through it.

Arms of Branches

{| class="wikitable" width="100%"
|-
!align=center colspan=4|Arms of the Kings of the Netherlands
|-
|align=center width="25%"|
|align=center width="25%"|
|align=center width="25%"|
|align=center width="25%"|
|-
|Arms of the King of the Netherlands 1815-1907<ref>:{{Blockquote|Arms of the Kings/Kingdom of the Netherlands: D'azur, semé de billettes, au lion coiffé d'une couronne fermée, le tout d'or, armé et lampassé de gueules, tenant dans sa patte dextre un faisceau de sept flèches d'argent, pointées et empennées d'or, et dans sa patte sénestre, une épée d'argent, garnie d'or, brochant sur le tout|}}</ref>
|Arms of the Queens and King of the Netherlands 1907–present 
|Arms of the Prince of Orange/Crown Prince of the Netherlands, 1980-2013 
|Arms of the Princess of Orange/Crown Princess of the Netherlands, 2013–present 

|}

Family tree

House of Orange and Nassau

Illegitimate Lines

Family tree Nassau-den Lek

 Family Tree Nassau-Zuylestein 

 Family Tree Nassau-Grimhuizen 

House of Nassau-Dillenburg

House of Nassau-Weilburg

The Grand-Ducal Family of Luxembourg

See also
Kings of Germany family tree

References

Sources
 Genealogy of the Middle Ages – House of Nassau
 Nassau-info.de
 Titles of Counts, Princes, and Dukes of Nassau
 
 Hay, Mark Edward, 'The House of Nassau between France and Independence, 1795–1814: Lesser Powers, Strategies of Conflict Resolution, Dynastic Networks', The International History Review'', 38/3 (2016), 482–504

External links
Archives of the House of Nassau

 
Roman Catholic families
Dutch monarchy
Modern history of Luxembourg
Lists of office-holders
Lists of monarchs
1090s establishments in the Holy Roman Empire
1093 establishments in Europe